Todor Chavorski (born 30 March 1993) is a Bulgarian footballer who plays as a forward for Yantra Gabrovo.

Career

Youth career
Chavorski has been training in Levski Sofia's youth academy since 2002. On 28 February 2010, he scored the winning goal in the Eternal Derby, playing for the Youth team. During 2010/2011 pre-season training he was called up to the first team.

Levski Sofia
Todor made his unofficial debut for Levski Sofia on 4 September 2010 in a friendly match against Montana. Chavorski entered the match as a substitute and scored the third goal for the final 3:1 win for Levski. On the same day, the head coach of Levski Sofia Yasen Petrov said, he would start training with the first team. Chavorski made his competitive debut during the 2010–11 season on 12 September 2010 in a 4–0 home win against Minyor Pernik, coming on as a substitute for Darko Tasevski.

Minyor Pernik
On 12 June 2018, Chavorski joined Third League club Minyor Pernik.

Career Stats
As of 9 January 2011.

References

External links
 
 Profile at LevskiSofia.info 

1993 births
Living people
Bulgarian footballers
Bulgaria under-21 international footballers
Association football forwards
First Professional Football League (Bulgaria) players
Second Professional Football League (Bulgaria) players
PFC Levski Sofia players
FC Pirin Razlog players
PFC Dobrudzha Dobrich players
PFC Lokomotiv Mezdra players
FC Botev Vratsa players
FC Oborishte players
PFC Minyor Pernik players
FC Lokomotiv 1929 Sofia players
FC Hebar Pazardzhik players